Erythropodium caribaeorum, commonly known as the encrusting gorgonian or encrusting polyps, is a species of soft coral in the family Anthothelidae.  It inhabits coral reefs and rocky bottoms in the Caribbean, Bahamas, and Florida, growing at depths of 0.5 to 25 metres.

E. caribaeorum is of interest from a drug discovery perspective because it produces eleutherobin, a diterpene glycoside with potential anticancer activity.

References 

Corals described in 1860
Anthothelidae